A.S.D. Giarre Calcio 1946 was an Italian association football club located in Giarre, Sicily. Its colors were yellow and blue.

History
The club's roots can be traced back to a club known as Associazione Sportiva Iona, founded by a president named Bottino. Due to financial constraints, the club was forced to fold and was refounded in 1948 as Societa Sportiva Giarre, in the town of Giarre the men who brought it about were;

 Nardo Patanè
 Isidoro Pino
 Giovanni Trovato
 Angelo Villaggio
 Salvatore Alpino
 Nardo Barbagallo
 Ignazio Cocuccio
 Narciso Creati
 Giovanni Panebianco
 Sebastiano Cavallaro

In its history, Giarre also played Serie C for several years; its last appearance in professional football is dated 1993/1994, when the team relegated to Serie C2 and was successively cancelled because of financial troubles. Its best result is a fourth place in 1992/1993 Serie C1/B under coach Gian Piero Ventura, successively coach of several Serie A teams.

Giarre F.C. achieved a second place in the 2005–06 Coppa Italia Dilettanti; this result allowed the Sicilian Serie D team to play in the Coppa Italia. In the first round, Giarre played against ACF Fiorentina of Serie A in Stadio Artemio Franchi, Florence. Giarre lost 3–0 to Fiorentina, after ending 0–0 the first half.

The club ended its history in 2008, after the property sold the football rights to a new franchise based in the neighbouring city of Misterbianco. A phoenix club named A.S.D. Sporting Giarre was formed and, through a number of sports rights acquisitions, reached Eccellenza in 2014 as A.S.D. Giarre Calcio. After having returned to play Serie D during the 2021–22 season, Giarre were however excluded from the league due to financial issues.

Notable former managers
 Gian Piero Ventura
  Adriano Lombardi

References

External links
 Official homepage
 Unofficial homepage
 Giarre Story

Football clubs in Italy
Football clubs in Sicily
Association football clubs established in 1952
Serie C clubs